Taz David Upshaw (August 8, 1902 – May 1970) was an educator, principal, and American football coach. He was the seventh head football coach at Tennessee A&I State College—now known as Tennessee State University—in Nashville, Tennessee and he held that position from 1930 until 1931, compiling a record of 3–4.

References

External links
 

1902 births
1970 deaths
20th-century American educators
African-American coaches of American football
Educators from Tennessee
Tennessee State Tigers football coaches
20th-century African-American educators